This list of food and drink awards is an index of articles of notable awards given for food and drinks. Food awards include awards for restaurants and food products, and cooking competitions. There are wine and spirits awards, beer awards, awards for cookbooks, and awards for food technology.

Food

Restaurants

Food products

Competitions

Other

Wine and spirits

Beer awards

Literary awards

Food technology awards

See also

Lists of awards

References

 
Food and drink